is a former Japanese football player.

Playing career
Nakazawa was born in Kanagawa Prefecture on September 13, 1980. He joined Japan Football League club Denso from Yokohama Flügels youth team in 1999. He played in 2 seasons and Denso finished at the 3rd place in 1999 season and 4th place in 2000 season. In 2001, he moved to his local club Yokohama FC which was promoted to J2 League from 2001 season. He became a regular player soon and played many matches as center back. However he lost his position in July and he could hardly play in the match. In 2002, he played as substitute defender many matches. However he could not play at all in the match from July and the club was finished at the bottom place in 2002 season. He retired end of 2002 season.

Club statistics

References

External links

1980 births
Living people
Association football people from Kanagawa Prefecture
Japanese footballers
J2 League players
Japan Football League players
FC Kariya players
Yokohama FC players
Association football defenders